The molecular formula C17H25NO3 (molar mass: 291.38 g/mol, exact mass: 291.1834 u) may refer to:

 Cyclopentolate
 EA-3834
 Levobunolol
 Mesembranol
 Pecilocin

Molecular formulas